The Yu Tse-san Incident, also known as Yu Zisan Incident, was a series of political events surrounding the death of Yu Tse-san, the chairman of the Students' Autonomous Association of National Chekiang University (NCKU), when he was imprisoned at the Hangzhou Garrison Headquarters, Hangzhou, China, on 29 October 1947. While the Nationalist government claimed to be suicide as he feared of being convicted as a communist bandit, the death of Yu became a cause célèbre causing nationwide demonstrations in November and December 1947.

Background 
Yu Tse-san, or romanised as Yu Zisan in Pinyin, was a third-year undergraduate student of Agronomy at the College of Agriculture of NCKU. He was elected as the chairman of the Students' Autonomous Association (SAA) of NCKU in May 1947. In August 1947, Yu participated in the national meeting of All-China Students' Federation secretly held in Hangzhou and was appointed the contact person of student unions in Zhejiang. He was a member of New Democratic Youth Federation (YF), but he was not a Communist. In fact, leftist ideas including New Democracy was popular among students due to a resentment of the reality after the World War 2.

In the summer of 1947, Chiang Ching-kuo organised summer camps for his Youth Army in Jiaxing and Suzhou to counter prevailing communist influence among young students. In response, the Shanghai Bureau of the Chinese Communist Party sent its undercover member Hong Deming to strengthen influence among students. Many students of Communist-controlled organisations joined the Youth Army and took leadership roles within the SAA. Thus, Hong organised the YF as a leftist organisation at NCKU and a special scout within the SAA to counter the influence of Chiang's Youth Army.

Arrest and death of Yu 

On 25 October 1948, after Yu attended the wedding of a NCKU alumnus in the city centre of Hangzhou, he went to Datong Inn, where he was arrested by several agents of Central Bureau of Investigation and Statistics (CBIS), a secret police force of Kuomintang, along with three other NCKU students, namely Chen Jianxin, Huang Shimin and Li Bojin. Chen and Yu were then taken to the prison of the Hangzhou Garrison Headquarter, while Huang and Li were sent to a local police office. 

The agents investigated the belongings of the students, where they found Chen's letters, in which he stated that he would found a new organisation named the New Tide with several others including Yu. The organisation would be based on the profits from a peace orchard in Fenghua. In Chen's belongings, the police also found books they considered to be communist, which included The Academic History of Modern Economics by Shen Zhiyuan, The Poverty of Philosophy and Wage Labour and Capital by Karl Marx. In Huang's belongs, they found The Secrets of America and The Russia Problem and The Prospect magazine. The students claimed that the books would be later shared to other students.

On 26 October, several SAA members notified Chu Kochen, the president of NCKU, of the arrest of the four students. Then Chu asked the government to proceeded legal procedures if they were highly suspicious or else he would stand bail for the students. On 27 October, Zhu Mingtao, the head of Zhejiang Garrison Headquarter told Chu that the four students were almost certainly communist bandits. When Chu requested to let the court deal with the issue, the head of Hangzhou police office replied that the evidence was solid and that the students would be sent to a court within one or two days. The SAA then resolved to go on a strike if the four students were not sent to a court by 29 October. Chu also telephoned the Garrison Headquarters on 28 and 29. When he was about to meet the Zhejiang Governor Shen Honglie, he was then informed that Yu committed suicide with two pieces of broken glass at 18:30 on 29 October. 

Chu soon went to the Garrison Headquarters with Li Tianzhu, a staff doctor of the university, who confirmed to him that Chu had been dead for at least 6 hours. Furthermore, Chu also examined the depositions of Yu provided by the police and found that one of the deposition was written in a way inconsistent with the way Yu used when answering exam questions at university. Thus, Chu refused to recognise the police's conclusion on the case and organised an  autopsy the following with the university faculty and students, who confirmed that Yu died of asphyxia after two pieces of broken glass cut through his throat and caused bleeding that blocked trachea. They also found Yu was tortured one or two days before his death. However, it is not clear whether Yu committed suicide or was murdered ever since his death.

Protests and demonstrations 
Soon after Yu's death, the local government introduced a city-wide curfew and censored the news, mails, telegram and telephones since 31 October. The Ministry of Education sent a telegram to all universities to avoid "echoing Chekiang University students' strike." However, NCKU students went on a 3-day strike since 30 October, ignoring the bans. On 2 November, the Communists won over 70 seats of 91 seats through the SAA's general election. The SAA then decided to continue the strike and to further publicise the incident to local middle school students. On 5 November, National Tsinghua University started a strike to protest for the incident. On 6 November, Yenching University, National Peking University, Université Franco-Chinoise and other universities in Peiping held memorial meetings for Yu, with around 5,000 participants. On 8 November, the Chiao Tung university in Shanghai first echoed the strike, followed by The Great China University on 11 and St. John's University on 12 November. NCKU students started a new strike since 10 November. 

On 20 November, a local court in Hangzhou sentenced three other arrested students to 7 years in jail. The SAA then decided to appeal the case to the Supreme Court and again organised a strike to protest against injustice.

On 14 March 1948, Yu was buried within the Wansong Academy, Hangzhou, which is now a Major Historical and Cultural Site Protected at the Provincial Level.

References 

History of Zhejiang University
Student protests in China
Protests in the Republic of China (1912–1949)
1947 in China
1948 in China
Chinese Civil War